Panther Stadium at Blackshear Field is a stadium on the campus of Prairie View A&M University in Prairie View, Texas. The venue is a multi-sport field used primarily for American football and is the home field of Prairie View A&M Panthers football. The 15,000-seat stadium holds 10 skyboxes/suites and 500 premium seats, a field house featuring a large weight room, a dining area, academic support space, locker rooms and training rooms, and other amenities. The stadium's inaugural game was held on September 4, 2016 between Prairie View A&M and Texas Southern.

History

The new stadium was announced in 2014. It would cost an estimated $60 million to build and would be built on the old Edward L. Blackshear Field. Led by Roy Perry, Prairie View A&M alums earned an estimated $30 million and started the Prairie View A&M Foundation in 2009. Those funds would be used for campus enhancements with $10 million being set aside for football stadium renovations. 

The Texas A&M board of regents approved the project in early 2015, and the old stadium was demolished that fall, forcing Prairie View A&M football to find a local high school to host their 2015 home games. Prairie View A&M hopes the new stadium will increase enrollment in the school. Overall students raised nearly 2/3 of the funds to build the new stadium. Additional construction at and around the stadium includes a new U.S. Olympic track and a new soccer stadium.

Attendance records

See also
 Prairie View A&M Panthers football
 List of NCAA Division I FCS football stadiums

References

External links
Prairie View A&M Athletics: Panther Stadium

American football venues in Texas
College football venues
Prairie View A&M Panthers football